Gordiichthys randalli is an eel in the family Ophichthidae (worm/snake eels). It was described by John E. McCosker and James Erwin Böhlke in 1984. It is a marine, tropical eel which is known from Puerto Rico, in the western central Atlantic Ocean.

References

Ophichthidae
Fish described in 1984